The American Music Award for Favorite Male Artist – Pop/Rock has been awarded since 1974. Years reflect the year in which the awards were presented, for works released in the previous year (until 2003 onward when awards were handed out on November of the same year). Justin Bieber has the most wins in this category with four. Michael Jackson is the most nominated male artist with 7 nominations and is the only singer to have won this award in three separate decades (80s, 90s and 00s).

Winners and nominees

1970s

1980s

1990s

2000s

2010s

2020s

Category facts

Multiple wins

 4 wins
 Justin Bieber

 3 wins
 Michael Bolton
 Eric Clapton
 Michael Jackson
 Barry Manilow

 2 wins
 John Denver
 Bruno Mars
 Lionel Richie
 Kid Rock
 Kenny Rogers
 Ed Sheeran
 Will Smith
 Justin Timberlake

Multiple nominations

 7 nominations
 Michael Jackson

 6 nominations
 Justin Bieber

 5 nominations
 Michael Bolton
 Drake
 Elton John

 4 nominations
 Bryan Adams
 Eric Clapton
 Eminem
 Billy Joel
 Barry Manilow
 Ed Sheeran
 Usher

 3 nominations
 Lenny Kravitz
 Bruno Mars
 Lionel Richie
 Kid Rock
 Kenny Rogers
 Will Smith
 The Weeknd
 Justin Timberlake

 2 nominations
 Phil Collins
 John Denver
 Peter Frampton
 John Mellencamp
 George Michael
 Pitbull
 Prince
 Puff Daddy
 Seal
 Sam Smith
 Rick Springfield
 Rod Stewart
 Stevie Wonder

References

American Music Awards
Pop music awards
Rock music awards
Awards established in 1974
1974 establishments in the United States